Laila is a feminine given name.

Laila may also refer to:
 Laila (actress), Indian actress
 Laila (1929 film), a Norwegian silent drama film
 Laila (1958 film), a German-Swedish film
 Laila (1984 film), an Indian Hindi film
 Laila (1997 film), a Maldivian drama film
 Laila (album), a 2008 album by Shahin Badar
 Laila, Dakshina Kannada, a village in Karnataka, India
 Laila Island or Perejil Island
 Cyclone Laila, a 2010 cyclone

See also
Leila (disambiguation)
Layla (disambiguation)
Leela (disambiguation)
Lejla (disambiguation)
Lelia (disambiguation)
Lela (disambiguation)
Layla and Majnun (disambiguation)